Pioneers Rest is a rural locality in the Fraser Coast Region, Queensland, Australia. In the  Pioneers Rest had a population of 60 people.

Geography
The locality is bounded to the east by the Mary River and to the north by its tributary Myrtle Creek.

History 
Pioneers Rest Provisional School opened in 1870. On 1 January 1909, it became Pioneers Rest State School. In 1927, it closed due to low student numbers, but reopened on 27 August 1928. On 30 January 1939, it closed again and reopened on 3 May 1949. On 21 August 1950, it closed again but reopened on 30 January 1951. In 1960, it closed permanently. It was to the south-east of the bend in Mungar Creek Access Road (approx ).

In the  Pioneers Rest had a population of 60 people.

Education 
There are no schools in Pioneers Rest. The nearest primary schools are Tiaro State School in neighbouring Tiaro to the south-east and Mungar State School in Mungar to the north. The nearest secondary school is Aldridge State High School in Maryborough to the north-east.

References 

Fraser Coast Region
Localities in Queensland